TV5 may refer to the following television enterprises, networks and stations:

TV5 (Finnish TV channel), a Finnish television channel owned by SBS Discovery Media
TV5 (India), Telugu-language 24-hour news channel
TV5 (Latvia), former television channel in Latvia
TV5 Mongolia, Mongolia based nationwide broadcasting network
TV5 Network, Filipino media company based in Mandaluyong.
TV5 (Philippine TV network), television network in the Philippines
TV5Monde, French-language global television channel commonly referred to as "TV5" or "Telecinq"
TV5 Québec Canada, Canada-based French-language television channel, which partners with TV5Monde
TV5 Užice, Serbian television channel, which broadcasts from the town of Užice
TV5, a cable subscription channel of Macedonian Boom TV now Vip TV

See also
Channel 5 (disambiguation)